Meconematinae is a subfamily of the bush crickets, with a worldwide distribution (but very limited representation in Antarctica and North America).

Tribes and genera 
In the Orthoptera Species File, the following are listed:

Meconematini 
Authority: Burmeister 1838 

subtribe Acilacridina
Authority: Gorochov, 2017 - southern Africa
 Acilacris Bolívar, 1890 includes subgenus Aroegas Péringuey, 1916
 Africariola - monotypic: Africariola longicauda Naskrecki, 1996
 Ovonotus Naskrecki & Guta, 2019
 Paracilacris Chopard, 1955
subtribe Meconematina
distribution: mostly Europe & Asia
 Alloxiphidiopsis  Liu & Zhang, 2007
 Amyttosa  Beier, 1965
 Borneratura  Gorochov, 2008
 Brachyamytta  Naskrecki, 2008
 Breviratura  Gorochov, 2008
 Caprixizicus Gorochov, 2022
 Kamerula  Gorochov, 2017
 Leptoteratura  Yamasaki, 1982
 Meconema  Serville, 1831 - Europe
 Naskreckia  Gorochov, 2017
 Odonturisca  Gorochov, 2008
 Parakamerula  Gorochov, 2017
 Proamytta  Beier, 1965
 Rhinoteratura Gorochov, 1993
 Subtilodecma Gorochov, 2022
 Xiphidiola  Bolívar, 1906
 Xiphidiopsis  Redtenbacher, 1891
 Xizicus  Gorochov, 1993
subtribe not assigned

 Anepitacta Brunner von Wattenwyl, 1891 (genus group: Africa)
 Abaxinicephora Gorochov & Kang, 2005
 Acosmetura  Liu, 2000
 Afroconema  Gorochov, 1993
 Afromeconema  Massa, 1997
 Allicyrtaspis  Shi, Bian & Chang, 2013
 Allocyrtopsis  Wang & Liu, 2012
 Alloteratura  Hebard, 1922
 Amytta  Karsch, 1888
 Amyttacta  Beier, 1965
 Amyttella  Beier, 1965
 Amyttopsis  Beier, 1965
 Aphlugiolopsis  Wang, Liu & Li, 2015
 †Archixizicus  Gorochov, 2010
 Asymmetricercus  Mitoki, 1999
 Athaumaspis  Wang & Liu, 2014
 Borneopsis  Gorochov, 2016
 Canariola  Uvarov, 1940
 Cecidophagula  Uvarov, 1939
 Chandozhinskia  Gorochov, 1993
 Cononicephora  Gorochov, 1993
 Cosmetura  Yamasaki, 1983
 Cyrtaspis  Fischer, 1853 
 Cyrtopsis  Bey-Bienko, 1962
 Decma  Gorochov, 1993
 Dinoteratura  Gorochov, 1998
 Doicholobosa  Bian, Zhu & Shi, 2017
 †Eogrigoriora - monotypic †E. gracilis Gorochov, 2010
 Eoxizicus Gorochov, 1993
 Epiproctopsis - monotypic E. silvamontana Gorochov, 2016
 Euanisous  Hebard, 1922
 Euxiphidiopsis  Gorochov, 1993
 Exoteratura  Gorochov, 2002
 Gibbomeconema  Ishikawa, 1999
 Gonamytta  Beier, 1965
 Grigoriora  Gorochov, 1993
 Indokuzicus  Gorochov, 1998
 Indoteratura  Ingrisch & Shishodia, 2000
 Kinkiconocephalopsis  Kano, 1999
 Kuzicus  Gorochov, 1993
 Macroteratura Gorochov, 1993
 Megaconema Gorochov, 1993
 Microconema Liu, 2005
 Microconocephalopsis  Tominaga & Kano, 1999
 Nefateratura  Ingrisch & Shishodia, 2000
 Neocononicephora  Gorochov, 1998
 Neocosmetura Xin, Wang & Shi, 2020
 Neocyrtopsides Chang, Wang & Shi, 2021
 Neocyrtopsis  Liu & Zhang, 2007
 Neoxizicus  Gorochov, 1998
 Nicephora  Bolívar, 1900
 Nigrimacula Shi, Bian & Zhou, 2016
 Nipponomeconema  Yamasaki, 1983
 Omkoiana  Sänger & Helfert, 2002
 Orophilopsis  Chopard, 1945
 Paracosmetura  Liu, 2000
 Parakuzicus  Ingrisch & Shishodia, 2000
 Paranicephora  Gorochov, 2001
 Paraphlugiolopsis  Bian & Shi, 2014
 Phlugiolopsis  Zeuner, 1940
 Pseudocosmetura  Liu, Zhou & Bi, 2010
 Pseudokuzicus  Gorochov, 1993
 Pseudoteratura  Gorochov, 1998
 Pseudothaumaspis  Gorochov, 1998
 Pulchroteratura  Tan, Gorochov & Wahab, 2017
 Shikokuconocephalopsis  Kano, 1999
 Shoveliteratura  Shi, Bian & Chang, 2011
 Sinocyrtaspiodea  Shi & Bian, 2013
 Sinocyrtaspis  Liu, 2000
 Sinodecma  Shi, Bian & Chang, 2011
 Sinothaumaspis  Wang, Liu & Li, 2015
 Sinoxizicus  Gorochov & Kang, 2005
 Sumatropsis  Gorochov, 2011
 Taiyalia  Yamasaki, 1992
 Tamdaora Gorochov, 1998
 Teratura  Redtenbacher, 1891
 Tettigoniopsis  Yamasaki, 1982
 Thaumaspis  Bolívar, 1900
 Xiphidonema  Ingrisch, 1987
 Zaxiphidiopsis Gorochov, 1993 (monotypic)

Phisidini 
Authority: Jin, 1987 - pan tropical

 subtribe Arachnoscelidina Gorochov, 2013
 Arachnoscelis Karny, 1911 – S. America
 Breviphisis Gorochov, 2017 - Madagascar
 Longiphisis Gorochov, 2017 - Madagascar
 Poecilomerus Karny, 1907 - Madagascar
 Supersonus Sarria-S., Morris, Windmill, Jackson & Montealegre-Z., 2014 – S. America
 subtribe Beiericolyina Jin, 1992
 Beiericolya Kaltenbach, 1968 – Pacific islands
 Estrinia Karny, 1926 – Australia & Pacific islands
 Meiophisis Jin, 1992 – Australia & PNG
 Neophisis Jin, 1990 – Indo-China through to Pacific Islands
 Oceaniphisis Jin, 1992 –Pacific islands
 Paraphisis Karny, 1912  – Australia & PNG
 subtribe Phisidina Jin, 1987
 Afrophisis Jin & Kevan, 1991 - Africa
 subgenus Afrophisis Jin & Kevan, 1991
 subgenus Jinkevania Gorochov, 2017
 Biproctis : B. anatomensis Jin, 1992 – Vanuatu
 Brachyphisis Chopard, 1957 – Indian Ocean Islands
 Carliphisis Jin, 1992 – Malesia
 Comorocolya Hugel, 2012 – Comoros
 Comorophisis Hugel, 2012 – Comoros
 Decolya Bolívar, 1900 -India
 subgenus Decolya Bolívar, 1900
 subgenus Eusrilankana Özdikmen, 2010
 Kevanophisis Jin, 1992 : K. ponapensis Kevan, 1992 – Pacific Islands
 Malagasyphisis: M maromizaha Hugel, 2012 - Madagascar
 Oediphisis: O. petalispina Jin, 1992 - Sulawesi
 Paradecolya Jin, 1992 – Indian Ocean Islands
 Phisis Stål, 1861 – Malesia through to Pacific Islands
 Rodriguesiophisis Hugel, 2010 R. spinifera (Butler, 1876) – Rodrigues Island endemic
 Seselphisis Hugel, 2012 – Seychelles

Phlugidini 
Authority: Eichler, 1938 - pan tropical

 Anisophlugis  Chamorro-Rengifo & Olivier, 2017
 Asiophlugis  Gorochov, 1998 - S.E. Asia
 Austrophlugis  Rentz, 2001
 Cephalophlugis  Gorochov, 1998
 Indiamba  Rentz, 2001
 Lucienola  Gurney, 1975
 †Miophlugis  Gorochov, 2010
 Neophlugis  Gorochov, 2012
 Odontophlugis  Gorochov, 1998
 Papuaphlugis  Gorochov, 2012
 Paraphlugiola  Cadena-Castañeda & Gorochov, 2014
 Phlugidia  Kevan, 1993
 Phlugiola  Karny, 1907
 Phlugis  Stål, 1861
 Stenophlugis  Gorochov, 2012
 Speculophlugis Woodrow, 2019

References

External links
 
 

 
Tettigoniidae
Orthoptera subfamilies